The Beriev Be-12 Chayka ("Seagull", NATO reporting name: Mail) is a Soviet turboprop-powered amphibious aircraft designed in the 1950s for anti-submarine and maritime patrol duties.

Design and development
The Beriev Be-12 was a successor to the Beriev Be-6 flying boat, whose primary roles were as an anti-submarine and maritime patrol bomber aircraft. Though tracing its origins to the Be-6, the Be-12 inherited little more than the gull wing and twin oval tailfin configuration of the older aircraft. The Be-12 has turboprop engines, which gave it an improved speed and range over the Be-6. The Be-12 also had retractable landing gear, which enabled it to land on normal land runways, as well as water.

The Be-12 was first flown on October 18, 1960, at Taganrog airfield, and made its first public appearance at the 1961 Soviet Aviation Day festivities at Tushino airfield. A total of 150 aircraft were produced, in several variations, with production ending in 1973.

Operational history

The Be-12 entered service with Soviet Naval Aviation, or AV-MF (Aviatcia Voenno-Morskogo Flota), in the early 1960s in the maritime patrol role, and is one of the few amphibians still in military service in the world. Initially its role was ASW patrol, but when newer missiles enabled United States Navy submarines to launch from further offshore it was converted to the search and rescue role (Be-12PS). Small numbers are still in service.
After the dissolution of the Soviet Union, some aircraft were converted to water bombers for the suppression of forest fires. During development of the Beriev Be-200 unique fire-fighting equipment was tested using a specially modified Be-12P, code-named "12 Yellow". After installation of the fire-fighting system, the aircraft was registered as RA-00046 and given the designation Be-12P-200. This modified Be-12 was also used to trial firefighting operations envisaged for the Be-200.
According to figures released in 1993, the Russian Navy had 55 aircraft in service. By 2005 this had dropped to 12, and by 2008 there were only nine aircraft still in service.
A surviving Be-12 is preserved at the Central Air Force Museum at Monino, outside of Moscow. Other examples exist at the Ukraine State Aviation Museum at Kyiv, Ukraine and at the Taganrog Air Museum, in southern Russia. It has been reported that the planes have been conducting patrols of the Crimean coast during the 2022 Russian invasion of Ukraine.

Variants

Be-12
Twin-engined maritime reconnaissance, anti-submarine warfare flying-boat. 2 prototypes and 130 production airframes built.
Be-12EKO
Projected ecological reconnaissance version. Not built.
Be-12I
Projected scientific research version designed in 1991. Not built.
Be-12LL
Conversion for testing the 3M-80 'Moskit' anti-shipping missile. Nose radar replaced with missile seeker head. One aircraft converted in 1980.
Be-12N
ASW version fitted with new sensors, avionics, MAD sensor and Nartsiss search/attack system. 27 aircraft converted.
Be-12Nkh
Utility transport, experimental passenger transport version. Military equipment removed, additional windows fitted. 2 built, both converted from Be-12.
Be-12P
Firefighting version. One 4,500 L tank and two 750 L tanks installed. Four aircraft converted in 1992.
Be-12P-200
Technology demonstrator for the Beriev Be-200. Fire-fighting configuration. One aircraft converted.
Be-12PS
Maritime Search and rescue version. Life rafts and survival equipment carried. 6 crew. 10 built new, 4 converted from Be-12.
Be-12SK
One aircraft converted in 1961 for use in SK-1 nuclear depth charge tests.
Be-14
All weather, day/night SAR version. Additional SAR and medical equipment. 6 crew. AI-20D engines. One built.
M-12
Stripped-down Be-12 used for record-setting flights. 2 Crew. Later returned to standard configuration.

Operators

Current operators

Russian Naval Aviation – received ex-Soviet Union aircraft. Nine Aircraft still in operation with the Black Sea Fleet.

Ukrainian Naval Aviation – received ex-Soviet aircraft, two still in operation.

Former Operators

Azerbaijani Air Forces – inherited three aircraft from the Soviet Union. They were decommissioned around 2000, and scrapped in 2018.

Egyptian Air Force – operated two or three Be-12s circa 1970, crewed by Soviet personnel, to maintain surveillance on the United States Navy's 6th Fleet in the Mediterranean.

Soviet Naval Aviation – passed its aircraft to successor countries: Russia, Ukraine and Azerbaijan.

Syrian Air Force

Vietnam People's Air Force – four aircraft exported in 1981.

Specifications (Be-12)

See also

References

Notes

Bibliography

 Yefim Gordon, Andrey Sal'nikov and Aleksandr Zablotskiy (2006) Beriev's Jet Flying Boats. Hinckley, UK: Midland Publishing. 
 
 

Be-0012
1960s Soviet patrol aircraft
Flying boats
Gull-wing aircraft
High-wing aircraft
Amphibious aircraft
Twin-turboprop tractor aircraft
Aerial firefighting aircraft
Aircraft first flown in 1960
Twin-tail aircraft